Plesiochoffatia is an extinct mammal of the Upper Jurassic. It was a relatively early member of the also extinct order Multituberculata. It was a resident of Portugal during the "age of the dinosaurs." It's in the suborder "Plagiaulacida" and family Paulchoffatiidae.

The genus Plesiochoffatia ("near Choffatia") was named by Hahn G. and Hahn R. in 1999. It has also been known as Parachoffatia ("beside Choffatia") Hahn & Hahn, 1998 (preoccupied).

Remains have been found in the Kimmeridgian (Upper Jurassic)-age strata of Guimarota, Portugal. Three species were described in the same study under the name of Parachoffatia; (P. peparethos, P. staphylos and P. thoas). As something else had already been given that name, the genus was renamed a year later.

References 
 Hahn & Hahn (1999), Nomenklatorische Notiz: Namens-Änderung bei Multituberculata (Mammalia). Geologica et Palaeontologica, 33, p. 156. (Nomenclatural Note: A name change within Multituberculata.)
 Hahn & Hahn (1998), Neue Beobachtungen an Plagiaulacoidea (Multituberculata) des Ober Juras. -3. Der Bau der Molaren bei den Paulchoffatiidae. Berliner geowissenschaftliche Abhandlungen E 28, p39-84. (New observations on the skull and jaw constructions in Paulchoffatiidae (Multituberculata, Upper Jurassic.)
 Hahn G & Hahn R (2000), Multituberculates from the Guimarota mine, p. 97-107 in Martin T & Krebs B (eds), Guimarota - A Jurassic Ecosystem, Verlag Dr Friedrich Pfeil, München.
 Kielan-Jaworowska Z & Hurum JH (2001), "Phylogeny and Systematics of multituberculate mammals". Paleontology 44, p. 389-429.
 With thanks to David Marjanovic for some information.
 Much of this information has been derived from  Multituberculata (Cope 1884).

Multituberculates
Late Jurassic mammals
Jurassic mammals of Europe
Prehistoric mammal genera